Danebury is an Iron Age hill fort in Hampshire, England, about  north-west of Winchester. The site, covering , was excavated by Barry Cunliffe in the 1970s. Danebury is considered a type-site for hill forts, and was important in developing the understanding of hill forts, as very few others have been so intensively excavated.

Built in the 6th century BC, the fort was used for almost 500 years, during a period when the number of hill forts in Wessex greatly increased. Danebury was remodelled several times, making it more complex and resulting in it becoming a "developed" hill fort. It is a Scheduled Monument and a  Local Nature Reserve called Danebury Hillfort. The Scheduled Monument is surrounded by a Site of Special Scientific Interest, designated as Danebury Hill.

Investigation
Until the 19th century very little was known about hill forts, as none had been excavated and their original purpose had been long forgotten. In the medieval period, their construction was attributed variously to iconic figures such as King Arthur, King Alfred, the Danes, Julius Caesar, and even giants. By the 18th century, it was widely thought that hill forts were Roman in origin.

Interest in hill forts was roused by the investigation of a hill fort at Worlebury Hill in the early-19th century. The first excavation at Danebury was carried out in November 1859, under antiquarian Augustus Wollaston Franks.

The first widespread investigation of hill forts was carried out in the second half of the 19th century under Augustus Pitt-Rivers. Pitt-Rivers' work on the hill forts of Sussex led him to the conclusion that most hill forts were built in the Iron Age, and it paved the way for future work on hill forts. In the 1920s and 1930s, there was "hill fort mania" in British archaeology; by 1940, about 80 had been archaeologically excavated.

In the late 1960s, Barry Cunliffe decided to examine a single hill fort and its surrounding territory in an attempt to shed light on Iron Age society, its politics, and population. With the permission of the site's owner, Hampshire County Council, archaeological excavations began in 1969 and continued until 1988. Over the twenty seasons archaeologists spent examining the site, they looked at the defences and the gateway, and excavated 57% of the interior, where the remains of wattle and timber houses were discovered. It was the lengthiest investigation of any hill fort in western Europe.

A further non-invasive survey was carried out in 1997, as part of the Wessex Hillforts Project, using a magnetometer.

History

There is no historical record of events in Iron Age Britain, so archaeological investigation is the only way to reconstruct the history of Danebury, and other forts. It is impossible to state with certainty every significant event in the hill fort’s history, but where an event leaves an archaeologically identifiable trace, a general chronology can be established, although dates are much less easy to establish. The hill fort was occupied from the mid-6th century BC until around 100 BC, and the defences were remodelled numerous times.

The north part of the fort was occupied by four-post structures, probably granaries, which were later replaced by storage pits, and in the south part, there were roundhouses in between granaries and storage pits. When Danebury was built in the 6th century BC, it coincided with the construction of several other hillforts in the Wessex region, all of a similar size and layout.

The first phase of defences dates from around 550 BC, and consists of a rampart behind a ditch. When the ditch was cut, the chalk rubble fill was used to build the rampart, along with some of the local clay soil. The material was contained by timber, making it a box rampart with a vertical face.

At least 50 years after the rampart was first built, it was raised with the addition of more chalk material; this has been interpreted as maintenance work due to the ramparts beginning to collapse as the timber box started to rot. The gates were burnt down not long after the east gateway was altered. For a short time the hill fort was gateless, when the east gateway was repaired the passage from the entrance was lengthened.

In around 400 BC the third phase heightened the rampart and at the same time the ditch was re-dug. The wooden box was abandoned in favour of allowing the rampart to slope down to the ditch, but to provide protection the rampart would probably have been surmounted by a dry stone wall made from flint.

Although the rampart and ditch were in use for a long time, during this period the east gateway was remodelled twice, making it longer, and creating earthworks on each side of the approach. The southwest gateway was given extra defences in the form of earthworks before being abandoned and filled in. Also in this period, the southern part of the fort became populated with four- and six-post structures, probably granaries, replacing the earlier roundhouses. The fort's centre was probably used for shrines while houses were mainly built close to the ramparts. A new series of earthworks was created beyond the already existing ring, turning Danebury into a complex multivallate (more than one series of earthworks) fort. They added  to the fort and probably were used to protect livestock.
 
Danebury was abandoned around 100 BC, in common with the trend across Britain for hill forts to fall out of use around that time. Once again, the east gate was burnt down, although this time it was not replaced. Most of the inhabitants deserted Danebury, and groups of bodies were disposed of in charnel pits. The site continued in use, but on a much smaller scale than before. Buildings were left to decay and the interior of the fort became used for grazing. By the start of the 1st century AD, the settlement of Danebury was probably nothing more than a single farm.

Hill fort
The hill fort dominates the local landscape, which rarely rises above , and has commanding views of the area. The surrounding country has light soil that would have been easily cultivated. Territory commanded by Danebury included areas of forest, pasture in the uplands, and access to water sources in the form of the River Test. To the west runs Wallop Brook which flows south east into the River Test.

The nearby hill forts of Figsbury Ring, Quarley Hill, and Bury Hill were probably established around the same time as Danebury. All of a similar size, the hillforts were generally equally spaced, commanding similar sized territories and resources. There is some debate whether hill forts were purely defensive structures, and to what extent they were occupied. Cunliffe interprets the ramparts as essentially defensive, although he concedes that they may have been a means of displaying wealth and power, as Danebury would have been visible for miles around.

The ramparts were the strongest part of the fort, with the entrances the weakest. The complex gateways support the view that the site was militaristic; the long, curving east entrance maximised the time it would have taken for attackers to enter the fort and would have allowed defenders on the ramparts more time to hurl missiles, while the southwest entrance narrowed forcing attackers together and causing disarray. Iron Age society was, in Cunliffe's view, "effervescent ... essentially unstable, and prone to conflict", and he uses the possible military nature of hill forts to support this view. The burning of the gates was probably the result of an attack, and the charnel pits dating from the end of the intense period of Danebury's occupation contain about 100 bodies, many with injuries that appear to have been inflicted by weapons such as spears and swords.

The fort was supplied with grain from the surrounding farmsteads, and could hold 20 times more food than the average farmstead, indicating Danebury had a higher status than local farmsteads. This is further supported by the fact that the hill fort was used as a "central place" where people could gather to trade and store commodities. Periods of intensified activity in hill forts such as Danebury coinciding with depopulation of the surrounding landscape could indicate the increasing importance of hill forts in society, or that there were times of unrest when people would retreat to the relative safety of a hill fort's ramparts.

While other hill forts were abandoned in the 4th century BC, in about 400 BC Danebury grew into what is known as a "developed hill fort". Danebury's importance in the landscape increased over time, as demonstrated by its continued use until around 100 AD. It was possibly inhabited by a king or chieftain and his family, retinue, and craftsmen, and may have housed a population of 200–350. There are traces of craft and industry on a large scale, and use of the site by a social elite is indicated by the presence of shrines in the centre of the fort.

Meteorite
The Danebury meteorite is an H5 ordinary chondrite meteorite found in 1974 during the excavation of a grain pit at the hill fort. Originally classified as a lump of slag it was identified as a meteorite about a decade later. It was found in a grain pit between two layers of infill with no particular evidence of it having been placed there, so it may have fallen directly into the pit. Carbon dating produced a date of 748–230 BC.

The meteorite was originally held by Oxford University but in 2014 was transferred to the Hampshire County Council Arts and Museums Service.

See also
Hillforts in Britain
List of hill forts in England

Notes

References

Bibliography

External links

Danebury Environs Programme 1989-95
Video of Prof Barry Cunliffe describing Danebury

History of Hampshire
Hill forts in Hampshire
Scheduled monuments in Hampshire
Andover, Hampshire
Former populated places in Hampshire
Local Nature Reserves in Hampshire